Southend High School may refer to:
 Southend High School for Boys
 Southend High School for Girls